"One Life More or Less" is a 2015 song by the Slovak musician Karol Mikloš, released on the Record Store Day, on April 15, 2015. A re-recorded version of the track is to appear on 'Poisoned EP' scheduled for release on 20 February 2017.

Credits and personnel
 Management
 Recording studio – Men at Sound, Trenčín, Slovakia 
 Publishing – Deadred Records  • Starcastic Records 
 Distribution – Wegart, Bratislava, SK • Starcastic, Prague, CZ

 Production
 Writers – Mikloš  • Alan Dykstra 
 Mixing and mastering – Gargle & Expel, Dublin, Ireland  
 Producers – Matúš Homola and Mikloš  • Autumnist and Yellowbrilla 
 Dubplate – Vinyl-Lab Studio , Trenčín, SK

 Personnel
 Vocals and musical instruments – Mikloš
 Saxophone – Peter Kohout , Trenčín, SK
 Photography – Slávka Miklošová, Trenčín, SK
 Cover art – Martin Turzík, Fluidum Design, Trenčín, SK

Track listings and formats
 7", SK/CZ, #DR-031/STC-50
 "One Life More or Less"  - 2:49
 "One Life More or Less" (Autumnist Remix) - 3:04

 Download, SK/CZ, #DR-031/STC-50
 "One Life More or Less"  - 2:49
 "One Life More or Less" (Autumnist Remix) - 3:04
 "One Life More or Less" (Yellowbrilla Remix) - 3:04

References

External links 
 "One Life More or Less" on Bandcamp
 "One Life More or Less" on Gargle & Expel 
 "One Life More or Less" on Deadred Records (in Slovak)
 "One Life More or Less" on Starcastic Records (in Czech)

2015 singles
2015 songs
Karol Mikloš songs
Songs written by Karol Mikloš